The 2012 Lehigh Valley Steelhawks season was the second season as a professional indoor football franchise and their second in the Indoor Football League (IFL). One of 16 teams competing in the IFL for the 2012 season, the Lehigh Valley Steelhawks were members of the United Conference.

The team played their home games under head coach Chris Thompson at the Stabler Arena in Bethlehem, Pennsylvania. The Steelhawks earned a 6-8 record, placing 4th in the United Conference, qualifying for the 4th and final playoff spot. They were defeated in the United Conference Semifinals, 21-79 by the Sioux Falls Storm.

Schedule
Key:

Regular season
All start times are local to home team

Postseason

Roster

Division Standings

References

External links
 Lehigh Valley Steelhawks official website

Lehigh Valley Steelhawks
Lehigh Valley Steelhawks
Lehigh Valley Steelhawks